Gérard Georges Sylvain Roland (born 5 April 1981 in Bordeaux) is a French footballer who plays for Olympique de Marseille B as a left defender.

Football career
Roland started his career with local FC Girondins de Bordeaux, but could only appear for the reserves during four seasons. In 2001–02, he had his first taste of top flight football, being sparingly used by Varzim S.C. (114 minutes, only one start) as the club retained its Primeira Liga status in Portugal.

Subsequently, Roland returned to his country, playing two years in the regional leagues with Langon Castets Football Club then signing with AS Beauvais Oise, with which he appeared in the Championnat National in his last two seasons. In 2008, he moved to Aviron Bayonnais FC, in the same level.

On 15 August 2010, Roland signed with Olympique de Marseille, being assigned to its B team.

References

External links

Stats and profile at Foot National 

1981 births
Living people
French footballers
Association football defenders
AS Beauvais Oise players
Primeira Liga players
Varzim S.C. players
French expatriate footballers
Expatriate footballers in Portugal